The Yonkers Police Athletic League is a sports facility located in Yonkers, New York.  It is housed within the Iris & Martin Walshin Center.  It is home to the Suburbia Roller Derby of the Women's Flat Track Derby Association (WFTDA).  

The Yonkers Police Athletic League (Yonkers PAL) is also home to a boxing program, a fully functioning kitchen, a basketball court and track that is open to the public everyday, and a recently created summer robotics camp.

External links
 City of Yonkers - Yonkers Police Athletic League

Sports in Yonkers, New York